Uralloor or Urallur is a place near Koyilandy in the Kozhikode district in Kerala state, India and is included in the Arikkulam Panchayath.

References

Villages in Kozhikode district
Koyilandy area